Cicindela senilis, or the senile tiger beetle is a species of tiger beetle found in western California. It lives in tidal mud flats and both coastal and inland salt marshes.  

Three subspecies are recognized:

 Cicindela senilis senilis (G.H. Horn, 1867)
 Cicindela senilis exoleta (Casey, 1909)
 Cicindela senilis frosti (Varas Arangua, 1928)
 Populations of Cicindela senilis frosti have been found in a salt marsh in Lake Elsinore in Riverside County, as well as in Los Angeles, Orange, San Bernardino, and San Diego Counties.

References

External links
 C. senilis at BugGuide.net

Beetles of North America
Insects of the United States
Endemic fauna of California
Beetles described in 1867
senilis